This page contains tables of azeotrope data for various binary and ternary mixtures of solvents. The data include the composition of a mixture by weight (in binary azeotropes, when only one fraction is given, it is the fraction of the second component), the boiling point (b.p.) of a component, the boiling point of a mixture, and the specific gravity of the mixture. Boiling points are reported at a pressure of 760 mm Hg unless otherwise stated. Where the mixture separates into layers, values are shown for upper (U) and lower (L) layers.

The data were obtained from Lange's 10th edition and CRC Handbook of Chemistry and Physics 44th edition unless otherwise noted (see color code table).

A list of 15825 binary and ternary mixtures was collated and published by the American Chemical Society. An azeotrope databank is also available online through the University of Edinburgh.

Binary azeotropes

Ternary azeotropes
Tables of various ternary azeotropes (that is azeotropes consisting of three components). Fraction percentages are given by weight.

‡Saddle azeotrope

‡Saddle azeotrope

References

Chemistry-related lists
Chemical engineering thermodynamics
Science-related lists